Naresh Mitra (18 May 1888 – 1968) was a Bengali actor, director and screenwriter.

Career
Naresh Mitra was born in 1888 in Agartala, Tripura, British India. He studied law from the University of Calcutta. He started his acting career in 1922 in Minerva Theatre. In 1923, Mitra joined Star Theatre in Kolkata and starred in several plays mostly in the role of anti hero. He worked and acted in number of films of Taj Mahal company, East India Film and Kali Films. Mitra directed Devdas in silent version produced by Eastern Film Syndicate in 1928. This is the first film adaptation of Devdas, the novel of Sharatchandra Chattopadhyay. He directed few films starring Uttam Kumar such as Bou Thakuranir Haat, Annapurnar Mandir. Mitra was also associated with the Bengali folk Jatra.

Direction
 Andhare Alo
 Chandranath
 Devdas
 Gora
 Kankal
 Bou Thakuranir Haat
 Annapurnar Mandir
 Kalindi

References

External links
 

1888 births
1968 deaths
Bengali film directors
19th-century Indian film directors
Film directors from Kolkata
Tripuri people
University of Calcutta alumni
Indian male screenwriters
Film directors from West Bengal
Male actors in Bengali cinema
Indian male stage actors
Bengali theatre personalities
20th-century Indian screenwriters
20th-century Indian male writers